On June 8, 1974, a significant tornado outbreak affected portions of the southern Great Plains and the Upper Midwest. The outbreak produced 36 tornadoes, at least 19 of them significant or intense, and is the second-deadliest June tornado event in Oklahoma history, with 16 deaths reported in the state, second only to the 35 people killed by an F4 tornado on June 12, 1942, in Oklahoma City. The deadliest tornado of the outbreak was a powerful F4 that struck the town of Drumright in Oklahoma, killing 14 people, 12 of whom were killed at Drumright. Another deadly and destructive F4 tornado struck the town of Emporia in Kansas, killing six more people.

The outbreak also produced two F3 tornadoes in the Tulsa metropolitan area that killed two people and, combined with flooding, produced the costliest natural disaster in that city's history up to that time—a disaster worth $30,000,000 (1974 USD). Additionally, the outbreak produced severe thunderstorm winds in the city which reached  for several minutes. In addition to confirmed tornadoes, a possible tornado occurred at 8:15 p.m.

Confirmed tornadoes

Oak Grove–Drumright–Olive–Skiatook, Oklahoma

A major tornado first hit the school at Oak Grove, then continued into Drumright. The tornado destroyed about 100 homes, killing 12 people in the northwest section of Drumright. Half of the 12 deaths were in a nursing home. Civil defense sirens only sounded shortly before the tornado hit, leaving residents with little time to react. However, the death toll in Drumright would have been significantly higher had the tornado hit the nursing home a few minutes earlier, when many people were crowded into the dining hall. After devastating part of Drumright, the tornado struck the small community of Olive, where it destroyed trailers and part of a school. One person died as nearby frame homes were also leveled. There, a woman died in one of several trailers that were destroyed. The tornado damaged brick homes near Skiatook before finally lifting.

Tulsa–Catoosa–Claremore–Big Cabin, Oklahoma

This was the first of two F3 tornadoes to hit the Tulsa metropolitan area, both of which occurred simultaneously. The tornado began north of Glenpool and moved northeast across Tulsa before striking parts of Catoosa, Claremore, and Big Cabin. The most severe damage occurred near Oakhurst and in sections of Tulsa. However, the tornado was rated F3 solely on the basis of damage to an anchored, concrete, iron-pipe cattle gate. A  section of the gate was pulled out of the ground and transported  from where it originally stood. The gate was "anchored by 3 posts, all set in 24 inches of concrete."  80 people were injured. One of the two deaths may have been due to flooding.

Tulsa–Broken Arrow–Inola–Choteau, Oklahoma

The second F3 tornado developed east of Sapulpa and moved east-northeast across south Tulsa, passing through not only Tulsa itself, but also part of Broken Arrow, Inola, and Chouteau. Along the way, the tornado struck the campus of Oral Roberts University, causing extensive damage. It also unroofed homes in the Walnut Creek, Southridge Estate, and Park Plaza housing additions. 42 people were injured. Both Tulsa tornadoes damaged about 300 homes and numerous businesses, leaving more than 1,500 Tulsa residents homeless. The supercell that spawned the Tulsa tornadoes originated in western Oklahoma and traveled  in 12 hours across the entire state, dissipating in Delaware County.

Emporia, Kansas

This devastating, long-tracked tornado first struck the northwest side of Emporia, touching down in the Flint Hills Shopping Center (now the Flinthills Mall). The tornado completely destroyed all 20 shops in the shopping center, where at least 75 cars were tossed into the air and mangled. Nearby, the tornado also struck a nursing home and a mobile-home park, killing five people in the mobile-home park. Both the nursing home and the mobile-home park were leveled. Additionally, a nearby apartment complex and a residential area were completely destroyed. 80 injured persons were hospitalized. After leaving Emporia, the tornado destroyed 10 farms before lifting. In all, at least 177 people were injured; the toll may have been as high as 220, most of which were in the Emporia trailer park.

References

External links

F4 tornadoes by date
Great Plains,1974-06-08
Tornadoes of 1974
Tornadoes in Oklahoma
Tornadoes in Kansas
1974 in Oklahoma
Natural disasters in Oklahoma
Natural disasters in Kansas
1974 natural disasters in the United States
June 1974 events in the United States